Beszterce-Naszód was an administrative county (comitatus) of the Kingdom of Hungary. Its territory is now in northern Romania (north-eastern Transylvania). The capital of the county was Beszterce (now Bistrița).

Geography

Beszterce-Naszód county shared borders with the Kingdom of Romania, Austrian Bukovina and the Hungarian counties of Máramaros, Szolnok-Doboka, Kolozs, Maros-Torda and Csík. Its area was 4,167 km² around 1910.

History
Beszterce-Naszód county was formed in 1876, when the Saxon district of Bistritz/Bistrița was united with the former Transylvanian Military Frontier district of Năsăud (Romanian Border Regiment II), also joined by parts of the former Doboka and Belső-Szolnok counties. In 1920, the Treaty of Trianon assigned the territory of Beszterce-Naszód county to Romania. In 1940, by the Second Vienna Award, it was returned to Hungary and was expanded with additional territories from the former Kolozs County. After World War II, it became again part of Romania; the territory of the county is now in the (larger) Romanian county Bistrița-Năsăud.

Demographics

Subdivisions

In the early 20th century, the subdivisions of the county Beszterce-Naszód were:

Notes

See also
Bistrița-Năsăud County of Romania

References 

States and territories established in 1940
States and territories disestablished in 1920
States and territories disestablished in 1945
Kingdom of Hungary counties in Transylvania